The Johnnie Walker Trophy was an invitational men's professional golf tournament played from 1980 to 1984 in Spain. The 1980 and 1982 events were played at Real Club de Golf El Prat near Barcelona, the others being played at Golf La Moraleja near Madrid.

Winners

References

Golf tournaments in Spain
Recurring sporting events established in 1980
Recurring sporting events disestablished in 1984